Grouse Creek can refer to:

Grouse Creek (British Columbia), a creek in Canada
Grouse Creek (Humboldt County, California) a creek in Humboldt County, California
Grouse Creek (Placer County, California) a creek in Placer County, California
Grouse Creek, Utah an unincorporated community in Utah
Grouse Creek block, geology